The Offering is the fifth studio album by rapper Killah Priest. It was released on August 21, 2007 through Good Hands Records, which is distributed through Traffic. Some songs reported to be featured on the album were released in advance, including the album's title track "The Offering", featuring Hell Razah. The album also features guest appearances by Nas, Immortal Technique, Ras Kass, Canibus and Kurupt.

Production was done by 4th Disciple, Kount Fif, Sam Sneed, Shakim Allah, Godz Wrath, Chuckie Madness, Arythmetic and others. Allhiphop.com says: "For the most part, the production on the album, from the likes of 4th Disciple and Godz Wrath, complements Priest’s flow and lyrics very well."

As previous albums, The Offering is heavy on lyrical content dealing with spirituality, freedom of the mind and religion. On the track "Salvation", Killah Priest talks about a spiritual battle with temptation.

Hiphopdx.com gave the album a favorable rating, while the written review was highly critical to Priest's style and execution of his lyrics. Overall ending with: "Overall, The Offering is a solid album. Making a collection of 17 tracks which are listenable as a whole isn’t easy, and Killah Priest more or less manages to pull it off."

Track listing

References

Killah Priest albums
2007 albums
Albums produced by 4th Disciple